John Tony Olsson (born 13 March 1965 in Visby, Sweden) is a former  international motorcycle speedway rider. He was a member of the Sweden speedway team when they finished third in the 1988 and 1989 World Team Cup finals. He also represented his country at Test level.

Career
Born on the Norland Island Gotland, Tony Olsson began his career with the club Bysarna. In 1982 he made his debut for the senior team and already 1983 he won Rider of the season. He twice finished runner-up in the Swedish Under-21 Championship in 1984 and 1985. One year later in 1986, Olsson finished runner-up in the World Under-21 Championship, despite suffering an engine failure in one heat. In 1988 he played a huge part in Bysarna becoming Swedish champions. The same year he won the Swedish Pairs Championship with former World Champion Per Jonsson. In 1991 he won it again with Dennis Löfqvist. In 1989 Olsson became the only Swedish rider to qualify for the World Final in Munich. In the only World Final of his career he finished in eighth place.

Olsson rode in the UK for the Reading Racers from 1986, where he became the team captain and then onto the Swindon Robins for a year in 1991 after he was forced out of Reading's line-up due to average restrictions after winning the British League Championship in 1990.  He returned in 1993 after a loan spell with Belle Vue Aces.

In 1994, whilst on loan again to the Swindon Robins, he won the British League Division Two Pairs Championship with partner Tony Langdon. 

He returned to the Racers in 1995 and in his final season in 1996 he was voted 'Rider of the Year' by the Reading fans.

Retirement
After his retirement he became the team manager of Sweden. As team manager he won the Speedway World Championship in 2003 and 2004.
He now works as Race Director in the Speedway Grand Prix.

World Final Appearances

Individual World Championship
 1989 -  Munich, Olympic Stadium - 8th - 8pts

World Team Cup
 1986 -  Bradford, Odsal Stadium (with Per Jonsson / Erik Stenlund / Jimmy Nilsen / Jan Andersson) - 4th - 73pts (0)
 1988 -  Long Beach, Veterans Memorial Stadium (with Conny Ivarsson / Henrik Gustafsson / Jimmy Nilsen / Per Jonsson) - 3rd - 22pts (4)
 1989 -  Bradford, Odsal Stadium (with Mikael Blixt / Per Jonsson / Jimmy Nilsen / Erik Stenlund) - 3rd - 30pts (7)

References

1965 births
Living people
Swedish speedway riders
Reading Racers riders
Swindon Robins riders
Exeter Falcons riders
Ipswich Witches riders
Sportspeople from Gotland County